Patrick Palmer (born 19 January 1988) is a Welsh rugby union player. A prop forward, he has represented Wales at Under 19 and Under 20 levels.

Palmer previously played for Cardiff RFC, Pontypridd RFC, and the Cardiff Blues Under-20 regional team. Palmer subsequently joined Newport Gwent Dragons and made his debut in the 2007–08 season. He was released by Newport Gwent Dragons at the end of the 2010–11 season, and rejoined Pontypridd.

References

External links
Pontypridd RFC player profile
Newport Gwent Dragons profile

Welsh rugby union players
Pontypridd RFC players
Dragons RFC players
1988 births
Living people
Rugby union props